
Year 879 (DCCCLXXIX) was a common year starting on Thursday (link will display the full calendar) of the Julian calendar.

Events

By place

Europe 
 April 10 – King Louis the Stammerer dies at Compiègne, after a reign of 18 months. He is succeeded by his two sons, Louis III and Carloman II. They are crowned at Ferrières Abbey, and rule the West Frankish Kingdom together as joint-kings.
 Baldwin I ("Iron Arm") dies, after 15 years as margrave of Flanders. He is buried in the Abbey of Saint Bertin (near Saint-Omer), and is succeeded by his son Baldwin II.
 Oleg, brother-in-law of the Varangian ruler Rurik, is entrusted to take care of his kingdom Novgorod after his death. He becomes regent of his son Igor.
 King Charles the Fat becomes ruler of the Kingdom of Italy, after the abdication of his brother Carloman of Bavaria, who has been incapacitated by a stroke.

Britain 
 King Alfred the Great establishes a series of fortified villages (or burhs) to protect Wessex against Viking raids. He creates a standing army to defend the strategic ports, and builds a network of well-maintained army roads (known as herepaths).
 Viking leader Guthrum becomes 'king' of East Anglia. A Viking fleet sails up the River Thames, and builds a camp at Fulham (near London) to prepare for an invasion of France.

Arabian Empire 
 Zanj Rebellion: The Abbasid Caliphate concentrates its efforts against the Zanj rebels in Mesopotamia. The Abbasid general Al-Mu'tadid leads an expeditionary force (10,000 men) to suppress the revolt. This marks the turning-point of the war.

Asia 
 Guangzhou Massacre: The Chinese rebel leader Huang Chao besieges the seaport in Guangzhou, and slaughters many of its inhabitants and foreign merchants. According to sources, the death toll ranges from 120,000 to 200,000 foreigners.

By topic

Religion 
 Fourth Council of Constantinople: Emperor Basil I calls for a synod, and reinstates Photius I as patriarch of Constantinople.
 June 7 – Pope John VIII recognizes the Duchy of Croatia, under Duke (knyaz) Branimir, as an independent state.
 Wilfred the Hairy, count of Barcelona, founds the Benedictine monastery at Ripoll, in Catalonia (Spain).
</onlyinclude>

Births 
 September 17 – Charles the Simple, king of the West Frankish Kingdom (d. 929)
 October 19 – Yingtian, empress of the Khitan Liao Dynasty (d. 953)

Deaths 
 April 10 – Louis the Stammerer, king of the West Frankish Kingdom (b. 846)
 April 18 – Seishi, empress of Japan (b. 810)
 June 5 – Ya'qub ibn al-Layth, founder of the Saffarid Dynasty (b. 840)
 Abi'l-Saj Devdad, Sogdian prince
 Áed Findliath, high king of Ireland
 Ahmad ibn al-Khasib al-Jarjara'i, Muslim vizier
 Ansegisus, archbishop of Sens (or 883)
 Baldwin I, margrave of Flanders
 Ceolwulf II, king of Mercia (approximate date)
 Cormac mac Ciaran, Irish abbot
 Gebhard, Frankish nobleman
 Gérard II, Frankish nobleman (or 877)
 Hincmar, Frankish bishop
 Landulf II, bishop and count of Capua 
 Li Wei, chancellor of the Tang Dynasty
 Rurik, prince of Novgorod
 Sulayman ibn Abdallah, Muslim governor
 Suppo II, duke of Spoleto (approximate date)
 Zdeslav, duke (knyaz) of Croatia

References